Consolata Boyle is an Irish costume designer based in Dublin. She is a frequent collaborator of English director Stephen Frears and has been nominated three times for the Academy Award for Best Costume Design for her work on three of his films: The Queen (2006), Florence Foster Jenkins (2016) and Victoria & Abdul (2017).

Early life
Consolata Boyle (born 23rd May 1949,) attended Holy Child Killiney secondary school, Co. Dublin, Ireland. She graduated from University College Dublin with BA in Archaeology and History, 1972. During that time she was involved in the university society Dramsoc, she trained in costume design at the Abbey Theatre and began her career in the early 1980s.  She also did a postgraduate diploma in textiles at West Surrey College of Art & Design (now University for the Creative Arts).

Main works
Her many credits include Anne Devlin (1984), December Bride (1991), Into the West (1992), Widows' Peak (1994), Angela's Ashes (1999), Nora (2000), When Brendan Met Trudy (2001), The Iron Lady (2011), Miss Julie (2014), Testament of Youth (2014) and Enola Holmes 1 (2020), and Enola Holmes 2 (2022). Her collaboration with Stephen Frears began with The Snapper in 1993 and continued with films including Mary Reilly (1996), The Queen (2006), Cheri (2009), Tamara Drewe (2010), Philomena (2013), Florence Foster Jenkins (2016) and Victoria & Abdul (2017).

Achievements
As well as her three Oscar nominations, Boyle has been nominated for several other awards throughout her career as a costume designer and amongst those that she has won are an Emmy Award for the television film The Lion in Winter (2003), a Costume Designers Guild Award for The Queen (2006) and four Irish Film and Television Awards for The Queen (2006), Chéri (2009), The Iron Lady (2011) and Philomena (2013). In 2022, she was awarded UCD Alumnus of the Year in Arts and Humanities.

Consolata Boyle is the recipient of the UCD Alumni Award 2022 in the Arts & Humanities

Personal life
She is married to Donald Taylor Black and they have one child.

References

External links
 

Irish costume designers
Women costume designers
Living people
20th-century Irish people
21st-century Irish people
Emmy Award winners
WFTV Award winners
Year of birth missing (living people)
People educated at Holy Child Killiney
Alumni of University College Dublin